Florian Post (born 27 May 1981) is a German politician who served as a member of the Bundestag from the state of Bavaria from 2013 to 2021. He was a member of the Social Democratic Party (SPD).

Political career 
Post became a member of the Bundestag in the 2013 German federal election. He was a member of the Committee on Legal Affairs and Consumer Protection until 2019.

References

External links 

  
 Bundestag biography 

1981 births
Living people
Members of the Bundestag for Bavaria
Members of the Bundestag 2017–2021
Members of the Bundestag 2013–2017
Members of the Bundestag for the Social Democratic Party of Germany
People from Neustadt an der Waldnaab (district)